The Second Van Cliburn International Piano Competition took place in Fort Worth, Texas from September 26 to October 9, 1966.

Romanian pianist Radu Lupu won the competition, while Barry Lee Snyder and Blanca Uribe earned the silver and bronze medals.

Jurors
  Howard Hanson (chairman)
  Joseph Benvenuti
  Reimar Dahlgrun
  Guillermo Espinosa
  József Gat
  Valentin Gheorghiu
  Árni Kristjánsson
  Lili Kraus
  Alicia de Larrocha
  Jean Mahaim
  Gerald Moore
  Boyd Neel
  Ezra Rachlin (local chairman)
  Claudette Sorel
  Margerita Trombini-Kazuro
  Beveridge Webster
  Friedrich Wührer

Results

References

Van Cliburn International Piano Competition